St. Mary's Cathedral (Polish: Katedra w Gorzowie Wielkopolskim, German: Landsberger Dom)  in Gorzów Wielkopolski is the seat of the Gorzów Catholic Diocese.

History 

Gorzów Cathedral is the oldest building in the Polish city of Gorzów Wielkopolski. It was founded at the end of the 12th century on the site of the city's former church. The church changed its denomination to Protestantism in 1537, which was changed back in 1945 when the city was transferred to Poland. The church was named a cathedral on December 12, 1945.

The cathedral houses a painting of the Assumption of the Virgin Mary from the altar of the Church of the Assumption of the Blessed Virgin Mary in Buchach.

On 1 July 2017 a fire broke out in the tower of the cathedral.

Architecture 

The cathedral was constructed in the gothic style, although it also includes romanesque elements.

Gallery

External links
 Sacred Restorations: Polish Cathedrals Built Anew

References

Roman Catholic cathedrals in Poland
Buildings and structures in Gorzów Wielkopolski
12th-century Roman Catholic church buildings in Poland
Gorzów Wielkopolski
Buchach